Mukhosh is a 2021 Indian Bengali-language psychological thriller film directed by Birsa Dasgupta starring Anirban Bhattacharya. The film, an official remake of the Malayalam movie Anjaam Pathiraa, released theatrically on 19 August 2021. The movie was released by the name Mukhosh instead of Psycho.

Synopsis
A series of gruesome murders jolt Kolkata. The latest victims are from the Kolkata police - they are kidnapped, slowly tortured, killed, and their heart taken out. The police invites Kinshuk, a criminologist, to analyze and present insights into the case.

Cast  
 Anirban Bhattacharya as Kingshuk Roy
 Chandrayee Ghosh as Kaberi Bose
 Payel De as Rai Roy 
 Tota Roy Chowdhury as Dr. David S. Paul
 Anirban Chakraborty as Adrish Burman
 Soumya Sengupta
 Shahir Raj as David Paul
 Kaushik Sen as Kalyan Roy Chowdhury 
 Sohini Sarkar as Souzie Paul
 Prantik Choudhury

Production 
Dasgupta started shooting the film in February 2021. Anirban Bhattacharya was announced as a lead cast.

Title interpretation
Talking about the title of the film, the director said, "The word ‘psycho’ is often loosely used, it's a slang to demean someone. We can rarely separate between the psychopath, the sociopath, the troubled and the abused-aggressor. Deranged villains who prey on the weak and innocent, forcing them into unthinkable acts and stealing from them that which they hold most dear are probably the real psychos. And also those who protect them are equally guilty. For the guardians of the devil are demons too. Hoping to deal with such a relevant social discourse through a film is exciting indeed."

References

External links 
 

Bengali-language Indian films
2020s Bengali-language films
Films directed by Birsa Dasgupta